Daniel Boone School is a historic school building located in the Northern Liberties neighborhood of Philadelphia, Pennsylvania.  It was designed by Irwin T. Catharine and built in 1926–1927.  It is a four-story, eight bay brick building with a two-story center section in the Late Gothic Revival-style. It features an off-center entrance with arched limestone surround, decorative tile mosaic panels, and a decorative brick and tile cornice. It is named for frontiersman Daniel Boone (1734-1820).

It was added to the National Register of Historic Places in 1988.

References

School buildings on the National Register of Historic Places in Philadelphia
Gothic Revival architecture in Pennsylvania
School buildings completed in 1927
Northern Liberties, Philadelphia
1927 establishments in Pennsylvania